U.S. Navy type commands perform administrative, personnel, and operational training functions in the United States Navy for a "type" of weapon system (e.g., naval aviation, submarine warfare, surface warships) within a fleet organization.

Aircraft carriers, carrier airwings, aircraft squadrons, and naval air stations are under the administrative control of the appropriate Commander Naval Air Force. Ballistic missile submarines, attack submarines, and submarine tenders come under the administrative control of the appropriate Commander Submarine Force. All other surface warships (i.e., cruisers, destroyers, frigates, littoral combat ships, patrol vessels, and amphibious warfare vessels) fall under the administrative control of the appropriate Commander Naval Surface Force. This type command structure is mirrored in United States Fleet Forces Command and the United States Pacific Fleet. Normally, the type command controls the ship during its primary and intermediate training cycles, and then the warship moves under the operational control of the respective fleet command once it is ready for deployment.

The two previous submarine type commands supervised Submarine Groups, Submarine Squadrons, and other units. The Commander of a Submarine Group is known, in official Navy communications, as COMSUBGRU (followed by a number), such as COMSUBGRU ONE.

Type command structure

U.S. Fleet Forces Command
 Commander, Naval Air Force U.S. Atlantic Fleet
 Commander, Submarine Force Atlantic
 Commander, Naval Surface Forces Atlantic
 Navy Expeditionary Combat Command
  U.S. Navy Information Forces
 Commander, Military Sealift Command
 Commander, Expeditionary Strike Group

U.S. Pacific Fleet
 Commander, Naval Air Force U.S. Pacific Fleet
 Commander, Submarine Force Pacific
 Commander, Naval Surface Forces Pacific

Disestablished type commands

U.S. Atlantic Fleet
 Amphibious Force Atlantic Fleet
 Destroyer Force Atlantic Fleet
 Minesweeping Force Atlantic Fleet
 Service Force Atlantic Fleet

U.S. Pacific Fleet
 Amphibious Force, Pacific Fleet - PhibPac was amalgamated into the new command Commander, Naval Surface Forces Pacific, probably in the mid 1970s.
 Battleship Force Pacific Fleet (ComBatPac)
 Destroyer Force Pacific Fleet (ComDesPac)
 Minesweeping Force Pacific Fleet (ComMinPac). The Commander, Minecraft, Pacific Fleet was responsible for all U.S. Navy minesweepers and other minecraft in the Pacific Fleet. Minesweep forces under the command of ComMinPac were known as MinPac or MINPAC. It appears that ComMinPac was merged into Commander, Naval Surface Forces Pacific in the early 1970s.
 Service Force Pacific Fleet (ComServPac) - also merged into Commander, Naval Surface Forces Pacific in the 1970s.

Lead-Follow
Effective 1 October 2001, the U.S. Navy developed a "Lead-Follow" arrangement among its type commands wherein one type commander is designated the senior lead for the specific "type" of weapon system (i.e., naval aviation, submarine warfare, surface warships) throughout the entire operating U.S. Fleet as it pertains to modernization needs, training initiatives, and operational concept development. These fleet TYCOM commanders will provide guidance to their respective "type" forces via the existing lead-follow TYCOM arrangement.

Commander, Naval Air Forces
The Commander, U.S. Naval Air Forces, Pacific Fleet (COMNAVAIRPAC) is designated as the Commander, Naval Air Forces (COMNAVAIRFOR) for the U.S. Fleet Forces Command, with the Commander, U.S. Naval Air Forces, Atlantic Fleet (COMNAVAIRLANT) as his deputy. COMNAVAIRFOR is responsible for modernization needs, training initiatives, and operational concept development for the naval aviation community throughout the U.S. Navy's operational fleet.

Commander, Naval Submarine Forces
Commander, Submarine Force, US Atlantic Fleet (COMSUBLANT) was designated as the Commander, Naval Submarine Forces (COMNAVSUBFOR) for the U.S. Fleet Forces Command, with the Commander, U.S. Submarine Forces, Pacific Fleet (COMSUBPAC) as his deputy. COMNAVSUBFOR is responsible for modernization needs, training initiatives, and operational concept development for submarine warfare community throughout the U.S. Navy's operational fleet.

Commander, Naval Surface Forces
The Commander, Naval Surface Force, U.S. Pacific Fleet (COMNAVSURFPAC) was designated as the Commander, Naval Surface Forces (COMNAVSURFOR) for the U.S. Fleet Forces Command, with the Commander, Naval Surface Force, U.S. Atlantic Fleet (COMNAVSURFLANT), serving as his deputy. COMNAVSURFOR is responsible for modernization needs, training initiatives, and operational concept development for the surface warfare community throughout the U.S. Navy's operational fleet.

Notes

External links
 The Type Commands - United States Navy official website
 Type Command - GlobalSecurity.org